Saint Joseph's College for Women is located in Karachi, Sindh, Pakistan. It is a college for women, owned by the Roman Catholic Archdiocese of Karachi.

History
It was established by the religious order, the Daughters of the Cross and is one of the most distinguished women's colleges in the country. It was founded in 1948 and was one of the first colleges for women in Karachi.

The building was constructed by Brother Hilary Lardenoye OFM. Since 1951, it has been affiliated with the University of Karachi. It began as an Arts college with the Science faculty added later in 1950.

Recent events
The college was nationalised in 1972 and denationalised in 2005, and returned to the Catholic Board of Education. On the 23 March 2009, the Government of Pakistan awarded the college principal, Sister Mary Emily FC the Sitara-e-Imtiaz, which she received from the Governor of Sindh. This was in recognition of her services to education.

The college offers subjects in science, commerce and arts education at the Intermediate and baccalaureate levels. In 2011, St. Joseph's College started education of computer sciences at the intermediate level.

Principals 
{| class="wikitable"
|+List of Principals of Saint Joseph's College
!#
!Principal
!Tenure
|-
|1
|Sr. Mary Alban, FC
|1948–1951
|-
|2
|Sr. Mary Bernadette, FC
|1951–1961
|-
|3
|Sr. Mary Emily Gonsalves, FC
|1961–1982
|-
|4
|Mrs. Bilquis Ifikhar
|1982–1983
|-
|5
|Mrs.  Munira Gulzar
|1983–1993
|-
|6
|Mrs. Kaniz J. Abedi
|1993–1999
|-
|7
|Mrs. Shahnaz Parveen
|1999–2000
|-
|8
|Dr. Tanveer Anjum, PhD
|2000–2005
|-
|9
|Sr. Mary Emily Gonsalves, FC
|2005–2008
|-
|10
|Ms. Mary Caleb
|2009–2010
|-
|11
|Dr. Bernadette Louise Dean, PhD
|2010–2013
|-
|12
|Sr. Roohi Ghouri, FC
|2013–2021
| Sr.Julie Pouch
| 2021-present

Alumni
 Naz Baloch,  Pakistani politician from Karachi and Central Vice President of Pakistan Tehreek-e-Insaf
 Bernadette Louise Dean, Principal 2010 – 2013
 Yolande Henderson, former headmistress of the St Patrick's High School O’ Levels section
 Shahida Jamil, former Minister for Law & Parliamentary Affairs 
 Dail Jones (born 1944), New Zealand politician
 Fauzia Kasuri, President of Women's wing in Pakistan Tehreek-e-Insaf
 Sehba Musharraf, former First Lady of Pakistan
 Hamida Khuhro,  former Sindh Minister for Education
 Zubeida Mustafa, journalist

References

External links
 http://www.stjosephscollege.edu.pk
 

Universities and colleges in Karachi
Catholic Church in Pakistan
Educational institutions established in 1948
Catholic universities and colleges in Pakistan
1948 establishments in Pakistan
Private universities and colleges in Pakistan